David Hausmann (born 5 April 1979) is a German fencer. He competed in the team foil events at the 2000 Summer Olympics.

References

External links
 

1979 births
Living people
German male fencers
Olympic fencers of Germany
Fencers at the 2000 Summer Olympics